A. Aslam Basha (born 1968 -2020) is an Indian politician and was a member of the 14th Tamil Nadu Legislative Assembly from the Ambur constituency. He represented the Manithaneya Makkal Katchi party.

The elections of 2016 resulted in his constituency being won by R. Bala Subramani.

References

External links 
 http://myneta.info/tamilnadu2011/candidate.php?candidate_id=632
 http://www.newsreporter.in/ambur-constituency-election-results-2011-aslam-basha-a-of-mnmk-wins-tamil-nadu

Tamil Nadu MLAs 2011–2016
Living people
1968 births
People from Vellore district